Klara Kedem is an Israeli computer scientist, a professor of computer science at Ben-Gurion University in Beer-Sheva, Israel and an adjunct faculty member in computer science at Cornell University in Ithaca, New York.

Kedem received her Ph.D. in 1989 from Tel Aviv University, under the supervision of Micha Sharir. Her most well-cited research publications are in computational geometry, and concern problems of shape comparison, motion planning, and Voronoi diagrams. She has also collaborated with philosophers and linguists on a project to decipher handwritten medieval Hebrew writings that had been overwritten in Arabic.

Selected publications

References

External links

Year of birth missing (living people)
Living people
Israeli computer scientists
Israeli women computer scientists
Researchers in geometric algorithms
Tel Aviv University alumni
Academic staff of Ben-Gurion University of the Negev